Westview School may refer to:
 Westview High School (San Diego), a high school in San Diego, California
 Westview High School (Tennessee), a high school in Martin, Tennessee
 Westview Elementary School (Winnipeg), an elementary school in Winnipeg, Manitoba
 Westview Elementary School, an elementary school in Vancouver, British Columbia